Persitema stands for Persatuan Sepakbola Indonesia Temanggung. Persitema Temanggung is an Indonesian football club based in Temanggung, Central Java. They currently compete in Liga 3.

Persitema stadium named Bhumi Phala Stadium. Its location was in downtown Temanggung, Central Java. This club has a fanatical supporter named TasMania (Temanggung Supporter Mania).

Players

Current squad

Former players

Indonesia
 Ugiek Sugiyanto  (2006)
 Supri Andrianto (2011)
 Tri Setyo Nugroho (2012/2013)
 Kurnanda Fajar Saktiaji (2012/2013)
 Idrus Gunawan(2011-2014)
 Yusuf Sutan Mudo(2011)
 Kukuh Andriyono(2011)
 Fajar Listyantara(2011)
 Origenes Kambuaya(2011)
 Muhamad Yunus (2007-2013)
 Afif Rosidi (2011)
 Akhmad Zulkifli (2011)
 Angga syatari (2011)
 Sunarso (2011)

CAF
  Augustin Elie Mbom (2014)
  Essomba Serge Marius (2012–13)
  Ntolo Arsene Aime (2012–13)
  Anthony Jomma Ballah (2011)
  Carter Konah Barkley (2011-12)

Coaches

Stadium 
They play their home matches in Bhumi Phala Stadium

Supporters 
Support group they called Tasmania and Tasmanita for supporting women.

Kit suppliers
 Former Sportwear (2021–now)

Sponsors 
 SKN Group
 SDA
 Pandawa
 SMH

References

External links
Official Blog
Liga-Indonesia site
 

Football clubs in Indonesia
Football clubs in Central Java
Association football clubs established in 1970
1970 establishments in Indonesia